Grigor Weston Taylor also known as Greg Taylor, is an Australian former actor, best known for his parts in several television series including Matlock Police and Glenview High.

Early life, education and teacher

Taylor was born in Penrith, New South Wales and attended Penrith High School. After finishing school, he became an English teacher. 

Taylor taught at Penrith and then at Marist Brothers, Westmead, New South Wales and he taught at Randwick Girls' High School in 1969.

Career
Grigor became a professional actor in 1971 and starred in the first 99 episodes of TV series Matlock Police as Senior Detective Alan Curtis. Between 1974–75 he portrayed Steve Hamilton in Silent Number and 1977–78 Taylor portrayed an English high school teacher, Greg Walker, in Glenview High.

Taylor took many other parts in Australian television series such as A Country Practice, Homicide, Special Squad, City West, The Flying Doctors, Butterfly Island, Dearest Enemy and Mission: Impossible (1988). 

Taylor also acted in several feature films, including High Rolling (1977), Mad Max 2 (1981), and Afraid to Dance (1989).

Filmography

References

External links
IMDb Grigor Taylor, IMDb

1943 births
Living people
Australian male television actors